Walney South is one of two wards on Walney Island in the Borough of Barrow-in-Furness, North West England. The 2001 UK census showed 5,784 people were living in the area, reducing to 5,307 at the 2011 Census.  There are two main settlements within the ward: Biggar and Vickerstown. Walney Bridge connects Walney South and, in fact, the whole island to mainland Barrow.

The ward will be combined with Walney North ward in April 2023 following formation of the new Westmorland and Furness Local Authority and be named simply 'Walney Island'.

References

Wards of Barrow-in-Furness